Khalid Al-Dawsari (Arabic: خالد الدوسري; born 23 May 1986) is a footballer who plays as a left back .

External links
 

1986 births
Living people
Saudi Arabian footballers
Hajer FC players
Al-Fateh SC players
Al-Adalah FC players
Ohod Club players
Al-Orobah FC players
Al-Nahda Club (Saudi Arabia) players
Al-Shoulla FC players
Al-Tai FC players
Al-Rawdhah Club players
Al-Najma SC players
Saudi First Division League players
Saudi Professional League players
Saudi Fourth Division players
Association football defenders